Miroslav Vanko (born 14 February 1973) is a Slovak long-distance runner. He competed in the men's 5000 metres at the 1996 Summer Olympics.

References

1973 births
Living people
Athletes (track and field) at the 1996 Summer Olympics
Slovak male long-distance runners
Olympic athletes of Slovakia
Place of birth missing (living people)